Cast stone or reconstructed stone is a highly refined building material, a form of  precast concrete used as masonry intended to simulate natural-cut stone.  It is used for architectural features: trim, or ornament; facing buildings or other structures; statuary; and for garden ornaments. Cast stone can be made from white and/or grey cements, manufactured or natural sands, crushed stone or natural gravels, and colored with mineral coloring pigments. Cast stone may replace such common natural building stones as limestone, brownstone, sandstone, bluestone, granite, slate, coral, and travertine.

History
The earliest known use of cast stone dates from about 1138 in the Cité de Carcassonne, France. Cast stone was first used extensively in London in the 19th century  and gained widespread acceptance in America in 1920.

One of the earliest developments in the industry was Coade stone, a fired ceramic form of stoneware.  Today most artificial stone consists of fine Portland cement-based concrete placed to set in wooden, rubber-lined fiberglass or iron moulds. It is cheaper and more uniform than natural stone, and widely used. In engineering projects, it allows transporting the bulk materials and casting near the place of use, which is cheaper than transporting and carving very large pieces of stone.

According to Rupert Gunnis a Dutchman named Van Spangen set up an artificial stone manufactury at Bow in London in 1800. Having later gone into partnership with a Mr. Powell the firm was broken up in 1828, and the moulds sold to a sculptor, Felix Austin. 
Another well-known variety was Victoria stone, which is composed of three parts finely crushed Mount Sorrel (Leicestershire) granite to one of Portland cement, carefully mechanically mixed  and filled into moulds. After setting the blocks are placed in a solution of silicate of soda to indurate and harden them.

Many manufacturers turned out a very non-porous product able to resist corrosive sea air and industrial and residential air pollution.

Manufacturing 
Cast stone is commonly manufactured by two methods, the first method is the dry tamp method and the second is the wet cast process. Both methods manufactured a simulated natural cut stone look. Wood, plaster, glue, sand, sheet metal, and gelatin are the molding materials that are used to manufacture drawing work and casting molds like delineate section, bed, and face templates. A low slump mixture is required for the dry tamp method that should be tamped into the mold. The dry stone consists of two layers, an inner layer of concrete and an outer layer of decoration which is also known as the facing layer. In the wet cast method, to flow material easily on the mold mixture of integrally colored with water and plastic is used. In dry tamp mixtures molds can be used many times, but in wet cast mixtures molds only can be used once.

Standards

In the US and some other countries, the industry standard today for physical properties and raw materials constituents is ASTM C 1364, the Standard Specification for Architectural Cast Stone.  Membership in ASTM International (founded in 1898 as the American Chapter of the International Association for Testing and Materials and most recently known as the American Society for Testing and Materials) exceeds 30,000 technical experts from more than 100 countries who comprise a worldwide standards forum.  The ASTM method of developing standards has been based on consensus of both users and producers of all kinds of materials.  The ASTM process ensures that interested individuals and organizations representing industry, academia, consumers, and governments alike, all have an equal vote in determining a standard's content.

In the UK and Europe, it is more normal to use the Standard "BS 1217 Cast stone - Specification" from the BSI Group.  The European Commission's "Construction Products Regulations" legislation states that by mid-2013 CE marking becomes mandatory for certain construction products sold in Europe, including some Cast Stone items".

See also
Geopolymers
Anthropic rock
Fambrini & Daniels Cast stone manufacturers.

References

Dictionnaire raisonné de l’architecture française du XIe au XVIe siècle/Béton

Concrete
Building materials
Masonry
Building stone
Artificial stone